The long-winged tomb bat (Taphozous longimanus) is a species of sac-winged bat in the family Emballonuridae. It is found in Bangladesh, Cambodia, India, Indonesia, Malaysia, Myanmar, Singapore, Sri Lanka, and Thailand.

References

Taphozous
Mammals of Bangladesh
Mammals of India
Mammals of Sri Lanka
Mammals described in 1825
Taxonomy articles created by Polbot
Taxa named by Thomas Hardwicke
Bats of South Asia
Bats of Southeast Asia